Lewis Jones House

Lewis Jones House (Centerville, Indiana), listed on the NRHP in Indiana
Lewis Jones House (Independence, Missouri), listed on the NRHP in Jackson County, Missouri

See also
Jones House (disambiguation)